Lesotho has a national netball league, and has participated in as well as hosted several netball tournaments.  The national league has some sponsors and the national team has been internationally ranked.

Tournaments
In April 2008, Lesotho hosted the Malawi Under-21 national netball team.  The match was part of the annual Confederation of Southern African Netball Associations (COSANA) tournament.

In September 2010, Lesotho performed poorly in the African qualifying tournament for the World Netball Championships.  During the competition, they lost 50–25 to Tanzania, 84–16 to South Africa, 58–24 to Zimbabwe.  The qualifying tournament took play in Pretoria, South Africa.

In December 2010, Lesotho hosted a one-day netball tournament. Ministry of Gender, Youth, Sports and Recreation was one of the co-organizers of the event.  The tournament was created to help raise breast cancer awareness.

Ranking
Lesotho has a national league. Corporations also sponsor teams around the country.  Some corporate sponsors include Central Bank of Lesotho, Standard Lesotho Bank, Lesotho Revenue Authority and Metropolitan Lesotho. In September 2010, the national team was ranked number twenty-three in the world. As of January 2011, the women's national team was ranked number twenty-five in the world.

References

Bibliography

External links 
Netball South Africa